Baiyun (generally ) may refer to:

Guangzhou
Baiyun District, Guangzhou
Baiyun Mountain (Guangdong)
Baiyun New Town
Guangzhou Baiyun International Airport, in Huadu District
Guangzhou Baiyun International Airport (former), closed down in 2004
Baiyun Subdistrict, Guangzhou, subdivision of Yuexiu District

Subdistricts
 Baiyun Subdistrict, Dalian, subdivision of Xigang District, Dalian, Liaoning
 , subdivision of Liangyuan District, Shangqiu, Henan
 , subdivision of Dongyang, Zhejiang
 , subdivision of Liandu District, Lishui, Zhejiang
 , subdivision of Haishu District, Ningbo, Zhejiang
 , subdivision of Kecheng District, Quzhou, Zhejiang
 , subdivision of Jiaojiang District, Taizhou, Zhejiang

Towns
 , town in Pingba District, Anshun, Guizhou
 , town in Zitong County, Sichuan

Townships
 , subdivision of Wulong District, Chongqing
 , subdivision of Yongtai County, Fujian
 , subdivision of Rongshui Miao Autonomous County, Guangxi
 , subdivision of Chishui City, Guizhou
 , subdivision of Shunping County, Hebei
 , subdivision of Nenjiang County, Heilongjiang
 , subdivision of Shimen County, Hunan
 , subdivision of Pujiang County, Sichuan
 , subdivision of Pingbian Miao Autonomous County, Yunnan

Other places
 Baiyun District, Guiyang, Guizhou
 Bayan Obo Mining District, Baotou, Inner Mongolia
 Baiyun Peak, a mountain in Zhejiang
 Baiyun Dam, in Hunan
 Baiyun Temple (disambiguation), several places